Major General William Richard Schmidt (October 14, 1889 – July 18, 1966) was a decorated United States Army officer who spent most of World War II as commanding the 76th Infantry Division.

Early life and military career

William Richard Schmidt was born on October 14, 1889, the son of Joseph Karl and his wife Anna (née Haman). Seeking a military career, he entered the United States Military Academy (USMA) at West Point, New York in 1909. He graduated four years later on June 12, 1913, which led to him being commissioned as an officer, with the rank of second lieutenant, into the Infantry Branch of the United States Army on the same date. Many of his classmates who he graduated alongside would, like Schmidt, attain high rank and become general officers in the years to come, during World War II. They included Douglass T. Greene, Paul Newgarden, Robert L. Spragins, Louis A. Craig, Lunsford E. Oliver, Henry B. Lewis, John E. McMahon, Jr., Carlos Brewer, Richard U. Nicholas, Alexander Patch, Robert H. Van Volkenburgh, Willis D. Crittenberger, Robert M. Perkins, William A. McCulloch, Geoffrey Keyes, Selby H. Frank, Charles H. Corlett and Henry B. Cheadle, along with numerous others.

Between 1913 and 1917, Schmidt served on the Mexico–United States border during the Pancho Villa Expedition. During this campaign, he was promoted to first lieutenant. Schmidt did not see combat in France on the Western Front during World War I and instead performed stateside duty at Schofield Barracks in Pearl Harbor, at Presidio of San Francisco and at Camp Fremont, California.

Between the wars
In 1921, now with the rank of major, Schmidt was transferred back to the USMA, where he was an instructor in the Department of Chemistry, Mineralogy and Geology. He stayed in this position until 1923, when he was transferred back to Hawaii.

Schmidt attended the U.S. Army Command and General Staff School at Fort Leavenworth, Kansas in 1928.

In 1933, he was appointed executive officer (XO) of the Civilian Conservation Corps at Camp Dix, New Jersey and served there for one year. Then he was transferred to Washington, D.C., where he was assigned to the Supply branch (G-4 Division) of the War Department General Staff on March 21, 1934.

World War II
In 1940, Schmidt was appointed commander of the 39th Infantry Regiment a, part of the 9th Infantry Division, and stayed in this capacity until the end of 1941. He was subsequently promoted to the one-star general officer rank of brigadier general in April 1942, four months after the American entry into World War II, and transferred to the newly activated 81st Infantry Division, where he became the assistant division commander (ADC) for Major General Gustave H. Franke, the division commander, for a short time.

Schmidt was transferred to the 76th Infantry Division on December 13, 1942, where he succeeded Major General Emil F. Reinhardt in command of the 76th Division. His chief of staff was initially Herbert T. Perrin. He was also promoted to the temporary two-star rank of major general in December 1942.

Schmidt stayed with the division throughout the rest of the war. He led the 76th Division overseas, first to England in December 1944, then a month later when it was sent to the Western Front, in the Ardennes-Alsace Campaign and Central Europe Campaign for which he received the Army Distinguished Service Medal, Silver Star, Legion of Merit and others.

Postwar

In August 1945, Major General Schmidt assumed command of the 3rd Infantry Division, as a part of the occupational forces in Germany. Schmidt was then transferred to the Third Army under command of Lieutenant General Geoffrey Keyes, his classmate from West Point, where he became the chief of staff on May 20, 1946. From July 1948 to May 1949 he commanded the 101st Airborne Division.

Major General William Schmidt retired from the army, after 38 years of service, in 1951 and died at the age of 76 years on July 18, 1966 in Walter Reed Army Medical Center in Washington, D.C. He was buried at Arlington National Cemetery, Virginia, together with his wife Helen Munn Goodier, with whom he had two daughters.

Decorations

Here is Major general Schmidt's ribbon bar:

See also
76th Infantry Division
Battle of the Bulge

References

External links
Generals of World War II
United States Army Officers 1939–1945

|-

|-

1889 births
1966 deaths
People from Knox County, Nebraska
Military personnel from Nebraska
American people of German descent
United States Army generals
United States Army personnel of World War I
United States Military Academy alumni
United States Army Command and General Staff College alumni
United States Army War College alumni
United States Army Infantry Branch personnel
United States Military Academy faculty
Recipients of the Distinguished Service Medal (US Army)
Recipients of the Silver Star
Recipients of the Legion of Merit
Officiers of the Légion d'honneur
Recipients of the Croix de Guerre 1939–1945 (France)
Recipients of the Croix de guerre (Belgium)
Recipients of the Czechoslovak War Cross
Grand Officers of the Order of Orange-Nassau
Burials at Arlington National Cemetery
United States Army generals of World War II